Syreeta van Amelsvoort is a Dutch Paralympic swimmer. She represented the Netherlands at the 1996 Summer Paralympics and at the 2000 Summer Paralympics and in total she won two gold medals, one silver medal and one bronze medal. She won a gold medal on each occasion. In 1996, she also won a silver and a bronze medal.

In 2000 she received the Order of the Netherlands Lion decoration.

References

External links 

 

Living people
Year of birth missing (living people)
Place of birth missing (living people)
Dutch female breaststroke swimmers
Dutch female butterfly swimmers
Dutch female medley swimmers
Swimmers at the 1996 Summer Paralympics
Swimmers at the 2000 Summer Paralympics
Medalists at the 1996 Summer Paralympics
Medalists at the 2000 Summer Paralympics
Paralympic gold medalists for the Netherlands
Paralympic silver medalists for the Netherlands
Paralympic bronze medalists for the Netherlands
Paralympic medalists in swimming
Recipients of the Order of the Netherlands Lion
Paralympic swimmers of the Netherlands
S8-classified Paralympic swimmers
20th-century Dutch women
20th-century Dutch people
21st-century Dutch women